The CSA Steaua București Fencing section  was created in 1947 and is one of the most successful fencing teams in Romania.

Achievements

Olympic champions

References

External links
 Official CSA Steaua website
 Club website

fencing
Sports clubs established in 1947